The 2008 Iowa Hawkeyes football team represented the University of Iowa and the Iowa Hawkeyes football program in the 2008 NCAA Division I FBS football season. Coached by Kirk Ferentz, the Hawkeyes  played their seven home games in Kinnick Stadium.

Leading up to the season

Previous season

Iowa opened the 2007 season on September 1, 2007, against Northern Illinois in a game played at Soldier Field in Chicago, Illinois.  Hawkeye running backs Albert Young and Damian Sims ran for 144 and 110 yards rushing respectively, while Iowa's defense held the Huskies to just 21 yards rushing.  The Hawkeyes won, 16–3, and ended the four-game losing streak that comprised the final four games of Iowa's 2006 season.  The next week, Iowa defeated Syracuse in the Hawkeyes' home opener, 35–0.  Jake Christensen threw for 278 yards and four touchdowns as the Hawkeye defense held the Orange to just five first downs and 103 yards of total offense in Syracuse's worst defeat since a 51–14 loss to Georgia Tech in the 2004 Champs Sports Bowl.  Iowa took a quick 28–0 lead with 9:55 left in the second quarter, and the Hawkeye defense sacked Syracuse six times while holding the Orange to 24 rushing yards.  Following the first two games – which saw the Iowa defense give up only three points – the Hawkeyes traveled to Ames, Iowa, to play 0–2 Iowa State on September 15.  The Cyclones began the season with losses to Kent State and Northern Iowa, but had won six out of the last nine games against the Hawkeyes, including three of the last four played at Jack Trice Stadium.  Iowa fell behind by 12 at half-time, and lost, 15–13, starting yet another four-game losing streak.  Placekicker Bret Culbertson scored all of Iowa State's points on five field goals, the last coming with one second remaining.

Following a 20-point loss at Penn State on October 6, which was preceded by losses to Wisconsin and Indiana, the Hawkeyes returned to Kinnick Stadium for a game against Illinois, who was coming into the game after home victories over Penn State and Wisconsin.  Christensen threw for 182 yards and the game's only touchdown – a 20-yard pass to Brandon Myers in the third quarter which gave the Hawkeyes a 10–6 lead.  However, it appeared that Illinois had taken a 12–10 lead on an 83-yard Eddie McGee touchdown pass midway through the fourth quarter, but it was called back due to a penalty. The Illini were forced to punt, but got the ball back with 2:28 remaining.  McGee threw passes of 28 and 24 yards to Arrelious Benn, putting the Illini at the Iowa 12-yard line.  However, Brett Greenwood intercepted a McGee pass at the goal-line, sealing the win and snapping an eight-game Big Ten losing streak for Iowa heading into a road game at Purdue.  But Iowa lost to the Boilermakers a week later, 31–6, to put the Hawkeyes' record at 3–5 with only four games remaining.  Curtis Painter threw for 315 yards and three touchdowns for Purdue, who had lost to the Hawkeyes, 47–17, only a year earlier. In Iowa's next game against Michigan State, the Hawkeyes entered half-time down by 14 points only to take a 20–17 lead with 10:05 remaining in regulation.  The game was destined for overtime when Michigan State's Brett Swenson hit a field goal with four seconds remaining, and the Spartans quickly garnered a seven-point lead following a Jehuu Caulcrick touchdown in the first overtime.  Down by a touchdown, Christensen found wide receiver Paul Chaney for a 23-yard touchdown pass and  following the extra point, the game headed to double overtime.  Iowa had the ball first and scored on a Jevon Pugh one-yard run, giving the Hawkeyes their own seven-point lead.  However, the Spartans were unable to score and Iowa won, 34–27.  The win was Iowa's first overtime victory in Kinnick Stadium history.

On November 3, Iowa defeated Northwestern, 28–17, after trailing, 14–0, in the first quarter.  The Wildcats took a 17–14 on a third-quarter field goal after the Hawkeyes tied the game at 14, but Sims ran for two fourth-quarter touchdowns to seal the Iowa victory.  Christensen threw for 299 yards for Iowa, who came back from a 14-point deficit in the second straight game.  Later, on November 10, Iowa defeated Minnesota, 21–16, to reclaim the Floyd of Rosedale trophy.  With one home game remaining against Western Michigan, Iowa held a three-game winning streak and a 6–5 overall record.  But the Hawkeyes lost to the Broncos, 28–19, and gave up 489 yards in the process.  Western Michigan took a 19–0 second quarter lead before Iowa scored 13 straight points to make it a six-point game.  But the Hawks would get no closer and eventually lost by nine.  Soon thereafter, Iowa was not selected for a bowl game, ending a six-year streak in which the Hawkeyes played in a bowl and rumors about the firing of Kirk Ferentz were rampant.

Coaching rumors
Following Michigan's loss to Appalachian State, rumors about the possibility of Ferentz becoming Michigan's head coach began to circulate.  LSU coach Les Miles was widely believed to be Michigan's top choice for the job, but any chance of that happening likely ended when LSU extended Miles' contract through 2012.  Ferentz's relationship with Michigan president Mary Sue Coleman may have contributed to the rumor, as Coleman was the president at Iowa when Ferentz was hired.  However, indications that the rumor was false were revealed when Iowa's sports information director, Phil Haddy, reported that Michigan had not asked for permission to talk with Ferentz.  It was a point reiterated by Gary Barta, Iowa's athletic director.  Ferentz's contract has a clause requiring him to contact Barta when talking to other schools, which indicates that he was not a candidate to become Michigan's next head coach.  On December 16, West Virginia's Rich Rodriguez was hired as Carr's successor at Michigan.

Soon thereafter, Ferentz was once again rumored for a coaching job, this time for the Baltimore Ravens.  Ferentz was an assistant head coach at Baltimore for six years, and became a "respected assistant" in his time there.  However, when asked about the Baltimore job, Ferentz said, "I've got a great job here, and with that being said, I'm sure Baltimore will get a top-notch coach."  Ferentz also cited wanting to see his son James – who is slated to be a freshman at Iowa in 2008 – play every weekend.  The Ravens eventually hired Philadelphia Eagles secondary coach John Harbaugh on January 18, 2008.

Recruiting class
The Hawkeyes had 24 verbal commitments for the 2008 recruiting class.  One of the players, Nate Guillory, is a junior college recruit.  The other 23 players are all high school seniors.  James Ferentz, Kirk's son, is among the players committed to play for Iowa in 2008.

Schedule

The Hawkeyes opened the 2008 season with three home games against Maine, Florida International, and Iowa State, followed by a road game versus Pittsburgh.  The game marked the first of four meetings between Pittsburgh and Iowa.  The teams will met in Iowa City in 2011 and 2015, and in Pittsburgh in 2016.  Pitt closed the 2007 season with an upset victory over second-ranked West Virginia.  Had the Mountaineers won, they would have likely played in the national championship game.

Following the conclusion of the non-conference portion of their schedule, the Hawkeyes will begin Big Ten play with a home game against Northwestern, and will open October with road games against Michigan State and Indiana.  Iowa was 1–1 against the Spartans and Hoosiers in 2007, winning, 34–27, over MSU while losing, 38–20, to IU.  Following the two road games, Iowa will play at home against Wisconsin.  Iowa lost, 17–13, to the Badgers in 2007.  Following a bye week, the Hawkeyes will play at Illinois, in what will be Iowa's third road game in five weeks.  However, Iowa follows this with two home games, against Penn State and Purdue.  Iowa lost to both teams in 2007 by 20 points or more.  A week following the Hawkeyes' final home game against Purdue, Iowa will play Minnesota in the Gophers' home finale.  Minnesota will look to take back the Floyd of Rosedale trophy a year after Iowa won it for the sixth time in seven years.  The game will likely also be Minnesota's last at the Hubert H. Humphrey Metrodome.

Two of Iowa's games – vs. Northwestern and at Michigan State – have been scheduled for 11:00 AM starts.  The season finale against Minnesota has been set for a 6:00 p.m. start time.

Personnel

Coaches

Kirk Ferentz will be in his tenth season as head coach at Iowa in 2008, and he has a 61–49 record entering the season.  Ferentz came to Iowa in 1999, following an assistant coaching job for the Baltimore Ravens and a heading coaching job at Maine.  Earlier in his career, Ferentz was an assistant coach under Hayden Fry at Iowa. From 1981 to 1989, Ferentz was Iowa's offensive line coach.  From there, Ferentz took the heading coaching position at Maine, and followed that by taking an assistant position in Baltimore.  He was named Iowa's 25th head football coach on December 2, 1998.

Norm Parker, Iowa's defensive coordinator, will also be in his tenth year at Iowa.  The same can also be said for Ken O'Keefe, Iowa's offensive coordinator.  Under Parker, Iowa's rushing defense has nationally ranked in the top 10 in three seasons. Parker has also coached several linebackers now playing in the NFL, including Chad Greenway, Abdul Hodge, and LeVar Woods.  Before coming to Iowa, Parker coached 12 seasons at Michigan State, five at Minnesota, and three at Illinois.  Under O'Keefe, Iowa has had the top scoring offense in the Big Ten twice, in 2001 and 2002, and 14 offensive players coached by O'Keefe have been drafted into the NFL.  Before coaching at Iowa, O'Keefe was the head coach at Allegheny College, where he won a Division III national title in 1990.  He was also head coach at Fordham University for one year before coming to Iowa.

Players
Returning for the Hawkeyes in 2008 are nine starters on offense, and as many as 18 total starters could be back for Iowa.  Senior running back Young is gone, along with fellow running back Damian Sims and fullback Tom Busch.  The rest of the offense, including the offensive line and wide receiver positions, are intact going into 2008. On the defense, up to seven starters may return, but the Hawkeyes lose linebackers Mike Klinkenborg and Mike Humpal along with defensive ends Kenny Iwebema and Bryan Mattison.  Cornerbacks Adam Shada and Charles Godfrey are also done with their playing days at Iowa.  Godfrey, who completed 2007 with five interceptions, was regarded as a possible third- to sixth-round draft pick in the 2008 NFL Draft before being picked in the third-round.  Another Iowa player, Devan Moylan, is seeking for another year after missing most of 2007 with an injury.

Returnees on offense include Jake Christensen, who succeeded Drew Tate at the quarterback position.  Christensen threw for 2,269 yards and 17 touchdowns in his sophomore season, while throwing only six interceptions.  Also returning are 11 true freshmen and 20 redshirt freshmen who saw playing time in 2007.  With 31 total freshmen receiving playing time, the Hawkeyes ranked third in the country in that category, behind North Carolina and Florida, who played 38 and 33 freshmen respectively.

Season

Maine

Source: Box Score 

Iowa was able to push visiting Maine around in this opening day victory. Running back duo Shonn Greene and Jewel Hampton combined for almost 200 yards rushing and three touchdowns as the Hawkeyes didn't have to go to the air often is this one-sided contest.

Florida International

Iowa shutout visiting Florida International in this blowout win. Ricky Stanzi had three touchdowns on just 10 passing attempts and Shonn Greene added 130 yards rushing as the Panthers could not stop the Hawkeyes. The final score isn't even indicative of how much Iowa dominated as they played their second string for the majority of the second half.

Iowa State

Iowa reclaimed the Cy-Hawk trophy in this low-scoring affair. Ricky Stanzi had trouble getting the Iowa offense going throughout the first half. Jake Christensen was brought in and led Iowa on a long drive that put them up 10–3 in the fourth quarter. The game's victor was still well in doubt until Andy Brodell returned a punt back 82 yards for a touchdown to put Iowa in control in the final minutes. With seconds left in the game Iowa kneeled down in the end zone resulting in a safety forcing Iowa State into a long drive that proved to be too much for the Cyclones to overcome.

Pittsburgh

Iowa entered the game at Heinz Field undefeated and the only FBS team remaining to not give up a touchdown in the 2008 season. Pittsburgh, despite losing their season home opener to Bowling Green, posed a tough team led by 2007 Big East Rookie of the Year and future NFL icon LeSean McCoy. Pittsburgh had finished third in the Big East preseason media poll after spoiling West Virginia's national championship hopes the previous season.

The Hawkeyes, still amid a quarterback battle between Christensen and Stanzi, decided to start and end the game with Christensen while rotating throughout the first half. Iowa struggled to defend quarterback draw plays and found themselves in a 14-3 hole with 12:34 left in the second quarter, despite holding McCoy to 18 rushing yards in the first half. Touchdowns from Shonn Greene, who rushed for a game-high 147 yards, and Christensen enabled Iowa to take a 17-14 late third-quarter lead. McCoy put the Panthers in front for good with a 27-yard fourth-quarter touchdown run. Trent Mossbrucker connected on a 39-yard field goal to get the Hawkeyes within a point, but both ensuing Iowa drives sputtered ending in a sack and a fumble, respectively, giving Pittsburgh the win.

Northwestern

Upstart Northwestern rolled into Kinnick Stadium off to their best start since 1962, having won their first four games of the year. Their strength of competition - Syracuse, Duke, FCS-level Southern Illinois and Ohio - was criticized though. The Wildcats were on the ropes early. Iowa, naming Stanzi as the starter after the previous week's loss to Pittsburgh, leapt to a 17–3 lead behind a Shonn Greene 18-yard touchdown run and a 45-yard touchdown catch by Andy Brodell. Northwestern tipped the score back in their favor with three straight passing touchdowns. Iowa had a final chance with 4:16 left in the game. Stanzi drove the offense to the Northwestern 8 but tossed four consecutive incompletions to seal the loss. Shonn Greene rushed for a career-high 159 yards on 21 carries but was sidelined for the Hawkeyes' final two drives from a fourth-quarter blow to the head while being tackled. The Hawkeyes suffered five turnovers and were held scoreless for the final 32:11 of the game.

Michigan State

Losers of two straight games, Iowa limped into East Lansing against yet another formidable opponent. Michigan State opened the season with a road loss to California but recovered to win four games in a row. Media billed the game as a showdown between Shonn Greene and Spartans' eventual NFL fifth-round draft pick Javon Ringer, the nation's No. 6 and No. 2-ranked rushers at that point, respectively. Turnovers again plagued the Hawkeyes, as the Spartans forced three in the first half on their way to a 16-3 third-quarter lead. Iowa narrowed the margin to three points with a field goal and 31-yard Andy Brodell touchdown reception. With the ball on the Michigan State 21 and 2:16 left in the game, the Hawkeyes faced a fourth-and-1 situation. Rather than attempt a 38-yard game-tying field goal, Iowa head coach Kirk Ferentz elected to keep his offense on the field. Ricky Stanzi handed off to Greene, but the Spartan defense dropped him for a three-yard loss. Greene rushed for 157 yards on 30 carries in the heartbreaker. Ringer finished with 91 yards in Michigan State's fourth straight home win over Iowa. Ferentz acknowledged after the game if they would have run a play-action pass instead of a run on Greene's three-yard loss, they might have scored a touchdown.

Indiana

Wisconsin

Shonn Greene had arguably the best game of his Doak Walker Award season as he rushed for 217 yards and four touchdowns with nearly nine yards per attempt. Wisconsin was utterly unable to slow him down and Iowa cruised to the win as they rarely had to go the air in this contest.

Illinois

Penn State

Iowa got a much-needed win in this under-the-lights upset. Penn State came in heavily favored and was playing for a chance to reach the national championship. It was a back-and-forth affair that came down to a crucial kick. Daniel Murray nailed a 31-yard field goal to give the Hawkeyes the victory. Iowa did have to kick off again though as one second still remained on the clock but Penn State was unable to do anything as Iowa recovered the ball. It was a critical game for Ferentz and propelled them to a 13-game winning streak.

Purdue

Minnesota

    
    
    
    
    
    
    
    
    

This was the final college football game at the Hubert H. Humphrey Metrodome. After a sluggish start in the first quarter Iowa dominated the rest of the way. The Hawkeyes shut out the Gophers and Iowa's offense was able to score at will. Shonn Greene became the all-time single season rushing leader with another great performance – 144 yards and 2 TD. Derrell Johnson-Koulianos hauled in 7 receptions for 181 yards and a touchdown.

Outback Bowl

Shonn Greene was unstoppable in this Outback Bowl blowout as he rushed for 121 yards and three touchdowns. Iowa shutout South Carolina through the first three quarters and forced five turnovers as well.

Statistics

Team

Scores by quarter

Offense

Rushing

Passing

Receiving

Defense

Special teams

Postseason Awards
 Shonn Greene - Winner of the Doak Walker Award, presented to the nation's top running back. Also received consensus first-team All-American honors and was named Big Ten Offensive Player of the Year.
 Mitch King - Named Big Ten Defensive Lineman of the Year

Team players in the 2009 NFL draft

References

Iowa
Iowa Hawkeyes football seasons
ReliaQuest Bowl champion seasons
Iowa Hawkeyes football